Protein phosphatase 1 regulatory subunit 12B is an enzyme that in humans is encoded by the PPP1R12B gene.

Myosin light chain phosphatase (MLCP) consists of three subunits- catalytic subunit, large subunit/myosin binding subunit (MBS) and small subunit (sm-M20). This gene is a multi-functional gene which encodes both MBS and sm-M20. MLCP regulates myosins and the dephosphorylation is enhanced by the presence of MBS. The sm-M20 is suggested to play a regulatory role in muscle contraction by binding to MBS. MBS is also encoded by another gene, myosin light chain phosphatase target subunit 1. sm-M20 shows higher binding affinity to this gene product than to myosin light chain phosphatase target subunit 2-MBS even though the two MBS proteins are highly similar. Although both MBSs increase the activity of MLCP, myosin light chain phosphatase target subunit 1-MBS is a more efficient activator. There are four alternatively spliced transcript variants described; two alter the MBS coding region and two alter the sm-M20 coding region of this gene.

Interactions
PPP1R12B has been shown to interact with Interleukin 16.

References

Further reading